The Berlin Township Public Schools are a community public school district that serves students in pre-kindergarten through eighth grade from Berlin Township, in Camden County, New Jersey, United States.

As of the 2020–21 school year, the district, comprised of two schools, had an enrollment of 609 students and 55.1 classroom teachers (on an FTE basis), for a student–teacher ratio of 11.1:1.

The district is classified by the New Jersey Department of Education as being in District Factor Group "CD", the sixth-highest of eight groupings. District Factor Groups organize districts statewide to allow comparison by common socioeconomic characteristics of the local districts. From lowest socioeconomic status to highest, the categories are A, B, CD, DE, FG, GH, I and J.

Public school students in ninth through twelfth grades from Berlin Township and Clementon attend Overbrook High School in Pine Hill as part of a sending/receiving relationship with the Pine Hill Schools. A representative from Berlin Township serves on the board of education of the Pine Hill Schools. As of the 2020–21 school year, the high school had an enrollment of 657 students and 61.6 classroom teachers (on an FTE basis), for a student–teacher ratio of 10.7:1.

History
The Huster Building, formerly used as a kindergarten and now used for administration, is named for Robert R. Huster, a Berlin Township resident who was killed in action on April 8, 1967, during the Vietnam War.

Schools
Schools in the district (with 2020–21 enrollment data from the National Center for Education Statistics) are:
Elementary school
John F. Kennedy Elementary School with 279 students in PreK through 3rd grade
Michael Murphy, Principal
Middle school
Dwight D. Eisenhower Middle School with 325 students in grades 4-8 
Marilyn Bright, Principal

Administration
Core members of the district's administration are:
Dr. Edythe Austermuhl, Superintendent
Megan Stoddart, Business Administrator / Board Secretary

Board of education
The district's board of education is comprised of nine members who set policy and oversee the fiscal and educational operation of the district through its administration. As a Type II school district, the board's trustees are elected directly by voters to serve three-year terms of office on a staggered basis, with three seats up for election each year held (since 2012) as part of the November general election. The board appoints a superintendent to oversee the district's day-to-day operations and a business administrator to supervise the business functions of the district.

References

External links
Berlin Township Public Schools

School Data for the Berlin Township Public Schools, National Center for Education Statistics

Berlin Township, New Jersey
New Jersey District Factor Group CD
School districts in Camden County, New Jersey